Great Grandpa are an American indie rock group from Seattle, Washington.

History
Great Grandpa began in 2014, releasing their first extended play titled Can Opener the following year on Broken World Media. Two years later, the band released their first full-length album, Plastic Cough, on Double Double Whammy. 

On October 25, 2019, Great Grandpa released their second full-length album titled Four of Arrows. Stereogum premiered Four of Arrows single 'Mono No Aware' in August 2019, and also named the record as "album of the week" on the week of its release.

Band members
Alex Menne – vocals
Carrie Goodwin – bass/vocals
Cam Laflam – drums/vocals
Dylan Hanwright – guitar/vocals
Pat Goodwin – guitar/vocals.

Discography
Studio albums
Plastic Cough (2017, Double Double Whammy)
Four of Arrows (2019, Double Double Whammy)
EPs
Can Opener (2015, Broken World Media)

References

Indie rock musical groups from Washington (state)
Musical groups from Seattle
American indie pop groups
Musical groups established in 2014
2014 establishments in Washington (state)